Everyone's Famous is a Canadian comedy web series, which premiered in 2013. Created by Andrew Bush of the sketch comedy troupe Picnicface, the series stars Ryan Beil as Donald Tipper, an unhappy call centre employee who tries to reinvent himself as a creator of online viral videos. The cast also includes Kayla Lorette, Pat Thornton, Kyle Hickey, Molly Dunsworth, Cory Bowles and Kevin Kincaid.

The web series consists of seven episodes. All seven episodes were also subsequently reedited into an hour-long comedy special, which aired on CBC Television on July 6, 2013.

The series garnered two Canadian Screen Award nominations at the 2nd Canadian Screen Awards, in the categories of Original Program or Series Produced for Digital Media, Fiction and Performance in a Program or Series Produced for Digital Media (for Pat Thornton).

References

External links

2013 Canadian television series debuts
2010s Canadian comedy television series
CBC Gem original programming
Canadian television specials
Canadian comedy web series